Michael Nicoll Yahgulanaas is a visual artist, author, and public speaker. His work has been seen in public spaces, museums, galleries and private collections across globe. Institutional collections include the British Museum, Metropolitan Museum of Art, Seattle Art Museum and Vancouver Art Gallery.

Yahgulanaas has a long history of environmental activism and political involvement. For many years he was an elected Chief Councillor of the Old Massett Village Council and a member of the Council of the Haida Nation.

Early life
Michael Nicoll Yahgulanaas was born in Prince Rupert, British Columbia in 1954 and grew up alongside Delkatla, near the fishing village of Masset on Haida Gwaii, off the north coast of British Columbia. He is a descendant of the influential artists, Isabella Edenshaw, Charles Edenshaw.

As a child, Yahgulanaas was an avid comic book reader and cartoonist. A prolific young artist, he soon covered the walls and ceilings of his bedroom with drawings.

At age 22, he began to direct his artistic endeavors outward, to effect change in the community and in relation to broader movements of environmental activism.

Art career

Training 
In 1978, Yahgulanaas began an apprenticeship with renowned Haida artist Robert Davidson. Yahgulanaas credits Davidson, as well as Haida master carver James Hart, in providing him with formal training in the classical forms of Haida art.

Haida manga
While Yahgulanaas trained under master carvers, his brief exposure to Chinese brush techniques with Cai Ben Kwan encouraged a departure from the typical expressions of the Haida art form and the development of a new genre of narrative art called "Haida manga."

Haida Manga blends Pacific Northwest Indigenous iconographies and framelines with the graphic dynamism of Asian manga.  Haida Manga is committed to hybridity as a positive force that opens a third space for critical engagement. It offers an empowering and playful way of viewing and engaging with social issues as it seeks participation, dialogue, reflection, and action.

Sculpture 
Yahgulanaas's works in metal include commissions from the British Museum (2010), The City of Vancouver (2011) and the 2010 Winter Olympics organizing committee. In 2015, his sculpture Sei, depicting a sei whale, was unveiled at the Vancouver International Airport. In January 2016, his sculpture Yelthadaas from the Coppers From the Hood series joined the permanent collection at the Metropolitan Museum of Art in New York City. This work was put on display in 2017. The piece hangs in Gallery 399, between the Modern and Contemporary Art wing and the Rockefeller Wing, where contemporary art borders Indigenous art.

Select exhibitions

Solo exhibitions 

 The Seriousness of Play, Bill Reid Gallery of Northwest Coast Art, Vancouver, BC, Canada, 2016
 Emily Carr and Michael Nicoll Yahgulanaas, Masters Gallery, Calgary, AB, Canada, 2013
 Old Growth, grunt gallery, Vancouver, BC, Canada, 2013
 Michael Nicoll Yahgulanaas, Glenbow Museum, Calgary, AB, Canada, 2009
 Michael Nicoll Yahgulanaas and Edward Burtynsky, Glenbow Museum, Calgary, AB, Canada, 2009
 Michael Nicoll Yahgulanaas -- Travelling the Museum, Museum of Anthropology, Vancouver, BC, Canada, 2007

Group exhibitions 

 Beat Nation, Vancouver Art Gallery, Vancouver, BC, Canada, 2012
 Challenging Traditions, Reach Gallery Museum, Abbotsford, BC, Canada, 2010
 Visions of British Columbia: A Landscape Manual, Vancouver Art Gallery, Vancouver, BC, Canada, 2010
 Haida Made: New Collaborations in Design, Harbourfront Centre, Toronto, ON, Canada, 2010
 What Use Art History?, Art Gallery of the South Okanagan, Penticton, BC, Canada, 2008
 Continuum: Vision and Creativity on the Northwest Coast, Bill Reid Gallery of Northwest Coast Art, Vancouver, BC, Canada, 2010
 Raven Travelling, Vancouver Art Gallery, Vancouver, BC, Canada, 2006
 Skung Gwaii Robe, Haida Gwaii Museum at Qay'llnagaay, Haida, Gwaii, Canada, 2002

Published works

Carpe Fin: A Haida Manga, (2019)
War of the Blink, (2017)
 Old Growth: Michael Nicoll Yahgulanaas, Liz Park, ed., (2012)
The Canoe He Called Loo Taas (illustrator), (2010)
The Little Hummingbird,  (2010)
The Declaration of Interdependence (illustrator),  (2010)
The Canoe He Called Loo Taas, (2010)
Red: A Haida Manga, (2009)
Flight of the Hummingbird: a parable for the environment, (2008)
Hachidori (2005)
A Lousy Tale (2004)
The Last Voyage of the Black Ship, (2001)
A Tale of Two Shamans, (2001)
No Tankers, No T'anks (1977). Volume 1 of the Tales of Raven series.

The original five–meter long mural that was published in 2009 as RED: A Haida manga is on a multi-year exhibit tour. Hachidori has sold over 100,000 copies in Japan, with a single-day record sale of 20,000 copies. Flight of the Hummingbird, first published in North America and now available in five languages, is also a bestseller and includes essays contributed by the Dalai Lama and Nobel Peace prize winner Wangari Maathai. Declaration of Interdependence, written by Dr. David Suzuki, was illustrated by Yahgulanaas.

References

External links
 Michael Nicoll Yahgulanaas, official website
 Haida manga

1954 births
Living people
20th-century First Nations people
21st-century First Nations people
Canadian comics artists
First Nations painters
First Nations sculptors
Haida artists
People from Prince Rupert, British Columbia